San Jose Secondary Educational Center, Málaga, Spain, was founded by the Society of Jesus in 1906. It offers education for infant through baccalaureate and initial professional qualification with various training cycles in both middle and high school.

History
In 1995 the school was renamed San José Secondary Education Center with definitive approval to impart Compulsory Secondary Education and the Baccalaureate. In 1997 final authorization was given to impart Middle and Higher Education Training Cycles. In 1998 the Center became a part of the Loyola Andalusia and Canary Islands Foundation.

In 2011 the City of Málaga awarded its Gold Medal to the center and posthumously the title Adoptive Son of the city to Padre Mondéjar. Infant education from age three was instituted in 2014.

See also
 List of Jesuit sites

References  

Jesuit secondary schools in Spain
Catholic schools in Spain
Educational institutions established in 1906
1906 establishments in Spain